The Torre dei Lamberti is an 84 m high tower in Verona, northern Italy.

Construction of the tower was started in 1172. In May 1403 the top of the tower was struck by lightning, but the restoration works didn't start until 1448 and took 16 years. During that time, the tower was enlarged: The more recent sections can be recognized today by the use of different materials (such as marble). The large clock was added in 1779.

The tower has two bells: the Marangona signals fires, work times, and the hours of the day, while the largest, called Rengo, is used to call the population to arms or to invoke the city's councils.

Buildings and structures in Verona
Lamberti
Tourist attractions in Verona